Hāshimīyah al-Tujjar was a Lady Mujtahideh in 20th century Iran.

She received ijtihād degrees in fiqh and uṣūl. Her niece, the daughter of her brother, became Iran's most prominent female religious intellectual of 20th century Iran, Nosrat Amin of Isfahan.

There are indications that the work of Nosrat Amin titled "al-Arbaʿīn al-Hāshimīyah" may have been begun by Hāshimīyah al-Tujjar.

References 

20th-century Muslim scholars of Islam
Women scholars of Islam
Iranian Shia scholars of Islam
20th-century Iranian women
Female Shia scholars of Islam